The Memorial to Carlo Barberini is a large memorial, featuring two allegorical statues and an inscription. It was designed by the Italian artist Gian Lorenzo Bernini upon the death of Carlo in 1630, and subsequently executed by Bernini and his workshop. It is in the church of Santa Maria in Aracoeli in Rome.

See also
List of works by Gian Lorenzo Bernini

Notes

References

Further reading
 
 
 

1630s sculptures
Marble sculptures in Italy
Sculptures by Gian Lorenzo Bernini
1630 works
Sculptures of men in Italy